Bea is a surname. Notable people with the surname include:

 Aisling Bea (born 1984), Irish actor, comedian, and writer
 Augustin Bea (1881–1968), cardinal of the Roman Catholic Church
 Carlos Bea (born 1934), American federal judge
 José Beá (born 1942), Spanish comic book artist
 José Alfredo Bea (born 1969), Spanish sprint canoer
 Nancy Bea, American stadium organist
 Sebastian Bea (born 1977), American rower